Jerrybuccinum is a genus of sea snails, marine gastropod mollusks in the superfamily Buccinoidea.

Species
Species within the genus Jerrybuccinum include:

 Jerrybuccinum malvinense Kantor & Pastorino, 2009
 Jerrybuccinum explorator (Fraussen & Sellanes, 2008)

References

Buccinoidea (unassigned)
Monotypic gastropod genera